Back in Bean's Bag is an album by saxophonist Coleman Hawkins with trumpeter Clark Terry which was recorded in late 1962 and released on the Columbia label.

Reception

Scott Yanow of AllMusic states, "Hawkins teamed up with the personable trumpeter Clark Terry for this upbeat set of solid swing. Terry in particular is in exuberant form on "Feedin' the Bean" and a delightful version of "Don't Worry About Me", but Hawkins's playing (particularly on the trumpeter's ballad "Michelle") is also in fine form".

Track listing
 "A Tune for the Tutor" (Pat Patrick) – 6:27
 "Don't Worry 'bout Me" (Rube Bloom, Ted Koehler) – 3:16
 "Just Squeeze Me (But Don't Tease Me)" (Duke Ellington, Lee Gaines) – 5:05
 "Ain't Misbehavin'" (Fats Waller, Harry Brooks, Andy Razaf) – 8:09
 "Feedin' the Bean" (Count Basie) – 6:18
 "Michelle" (Clark Terry) – 3:29
 "Squeeze Me" (Waller, Clarence Williams) – 5:01
 "Tommy's Blues" (Tommy Flanagan) – 6:32 Additional track on reissue

Personnel
Coleman Hawkins – tenor saxophone
Clark Terry – trumpet, flugelhorn
Tommy Flanagan – piano
Major Holley – bass
Dave Bailey – drums

References

Coleman Hawkins albums
Clark Terry albums
1963 albums
Columbia Records albums
Albums produced by Mike Berniker